Saint-Martin-de-l'Arçon (Languedocien: Sant Martin de l'Arçon) is a commune in the Hérault department in the Occitanie region in southern France.

Population

See also
Communes of the Hérault department

References

Communes of Hérault